Don't Knock Twice may refer to:

 Don't Knock Twice (film), a supernatural horror film directed by Caradog W. James
 Don't Knock Twice (video game), a horror video game developed by Wales Interactive